Eulimostraca is a genus of small, ectoparasitic sea snails, marine gastropod mollusks in the family Eulimidae.

Species 
Species within the genus Eulimostraca include:
 Eulimostraca angusta (Watson, 1886)
 Eulimostraca armonica Espinosa, Ortea, Fernandez-Garcés & Moro, 2007
 Eulimostraca burragei (Bartsch, 1917)
 Eulimostraca dalmata Espinosa, Ortea, Fernandez-Garcés & Moro, 2007
 Eulimostraca encalada Espinosa, Ortea & Magaña, 2006
 Eulimostraca galapagensis Bartsch, 1917
 Eulimostraca indomatta Simone & Birman, 2007
 Eulimostraca linearis (Carpenter, 1858)
 Eulimostraca macleani Warén, 1992
 Eulimostraca subcarinata (d'Orbigny, 1841)
Species brought into synonymy 
 Eulimostraca attilioi Hertz & Hertz, 1982: synonym of Niso attilioi (Hertz & Hertz, 1982)
 Eulimostraca bartschi Strong & Hertlein, 1937: synonym of  Microeulima bartschi (Strong & Hertlein, 1937)
 Eulimostraca hemphilli [sic]: synonym of Eulimostraca hemphilli [sic] : synonym of Microeulima hemphillii (Dall, 1884)
 Eulimostraca panamensis (Bartsch, 1917): synonym of  Eulimostraca burragei (Bartsch, 1917)
 Eulimostraca pusio (A. Adams, 1864): synonym of  Leiostraca titania A. Adams, 1861
 Eulimostraca subcarinata Simone & Birman, 2006: synonym of Eulimostraca indomatta Simone & Birman, 2007

References

 Warén A. (1984) A generic revision of the family Eulimidae (Gastropoda, Prosobranchia). Journal of Molluscan Studies suppl. 13: 1-96. page(s): 46

External links
 To World Register of Marine Species

Eulimidae